Hydroporini is a tribe of predaceous diving beetles in the family Dytiscidae. There are at least 730 described species in Hydroporini.

See also
 List of Hydroporini genera

References

 D.J. Larson, Y. Alarie, and R.E. Roughley. (2001). Predaceous Diving Beetles (Coleoptera: Dytiscidae) of the Nearctic Region, with emphasis on the fauna of Canada and Alaska. NRC 43253.
 Nilsson, Anders N. (2001). World Catalogue of Insects, volume 3: Dytiscidae (Coleoptera), 395.

Further reading

 Arnett, R. H. Jr., and M. C. Thomas. (eds.). (21 December 2000) American Beetles, Volume I: Archostemata, Myxophaga, Adephaga, Polyphaga: Staphyliniformia. CRC Press LLC, Boca Raton, Florida. 
 
 Richard E. White. (1983). Peterson Field Guides: Beetles. Houghton Mifflin Company.

External links

 NCBI Taxonomy Browser, Hydroporini

Dytiscidae
Beetle tribes